She Loves Me Not is a 1934 American comedy film directed by Elliott Nugent and starring Bing Crosby and Miriam Hopkins. Based on the novel She Loves Me Not by Edward Hope and the subsequent play by Howard Lindsay, the film is about a cabaret dancer who witnesses a murder and is forced to hide from gangsters by disguising herself as a male Princeton student. Distributed by Paramount Pictures, the film has been remade twice as True to the Army (1942) and as How to Be Very, Very Popular in (1955), the latter starring Betty Grable. The film is notable for containing one of the first major performances of Bing Crosby, and it helped launch him to future stardom. This was also the last film that Miriam Hopkins made under her contract to Paramount Pictures, which began in the early 1930s upon her arrival in Hollywood. In 1935, the film received an Academy Award nomination for Best Original Song for "Love in Bloom", theme song of comedian Jack Benny.

Cast

 Bing Crosby as Paul Lawton
 Miriam Hopkins as Curly Flagg
 Kitty Carlisle as Midge Mercer
 Edward J. Nugent as Buzz Jones
 Henry Stephenson as Dean Mercer
 Maude Turner Gordon as Mrs. Arbuthnot 
 Warren Hymer as Mugg Schnitzel
 Lynne Overman as Gus McNeal
 Judith Allen as Frances Arbuthnot
 George Barbier as J. Thorval Jones
 Henry Kolker as Charles M. Lawton
 Vince Barnett as Baldy O'Hara
 Margaret Armstrong as Martha
 Ralf Harolde as J. B.
 Matt McHugh as Andy
 Franklyn Cordell as Arkle

Reception
The film was one of Paramount's biggest hits of the year.

Mordaunt Hall, writing in The New York Times, liked it saying, "As on the stage, this adaptation is a swift-paced piece of hilarity, with occasional romantic interludes during which Bing Crosby and Kitty Carlisle contribute some tuneful melodies. Some of the farcical episodes in this Paramount offering are apt to recall that famous old comedy, "Charley's Aunt", but in the present production, instead of having a varsity student in skirts, they dress up a cabaret girl in male attire after she has invaded a dormitory room."

Variety had a mixed reaction "...But apart from this possible captiousness Par's ‘She Loves’ holds plenty for the gate. Crosby is most of it. He looks better than ever (somehow his stature has been built up although the faintest suggestion of embonpoint doesn't quite jell with a Princeton undergrad), but he acts intelligently and sings those tunes. The songs will be no small asset to the film. There are three outstanders, two by Revel and Gordon—‘Straight from the Shoulder (Right from the Heart),’ and ‘I’m Hummin’, (I'm Singin’, I'm Whistlin’) and one by Robin and Rainger (‘Love in Bloom’) — and the latter is the smash hit of the flicker and currently Tin Pan Alley's No. 1 song, so it's easy to figure out the b.o. reaction."

Songs    
 "Love in Bloom" (Leo Robin and Ralph Rainger) – sung by Bing Crosby and Kitty Carlisle
 "After All You're All I'm After" (Edward Heyman and Arthur Schwartz) (written for the film but not used)
 "Straight from the Shoulder" (Mack Gordon and Harry Revel) – sung by Bing Crosby and Kitty Carlisle
 "I'm Hummin', I'm Whistlin', I'm Singin'" (Mack Gordon and Harry Revel) – sung by Bing Crosby.
 "Put a Little Rhythm in Everything You Do" (Mack Gordon and Harry Revel) – sung by Miriam Hopkins.

Crosby recorded some of the songs for Brunswick Records. "Love in Bloom" topped the charts of the day for six weeks.

References

External links
 

1934 comedy films
1934 films
American black-and-white films
Cross-dressing in American films
Films based on American novels
Films directed by Elliott Nugent
Films set in universities and colleges
Paramount Pictures films
American comedy films
1930s English-language films
1930s American films